Long Lake is a lake located northeast of Holiday House, New York. The lake is home to: largemouth bass, crappie, rock bass, northern pike, yellow perch, smallmouth bass, walleye, white perch, and black bullhead. There is a state owned carry down launch located on the northwest shore off Long Lake Road.

Locations and tributaries 

Brandy Lake – A small 14 acre lake located west of Long Lake. Brandy Lake empties into Long Lake. Fish species in Brandy Lake include brook trout, and bullhead. Trail access off Round Lake Road on the west shore.

References 

Lakes of Oneida County, New York
Lakes of New York (state)